The 1919 Ole Miss Rebels football team represented the University of Mississippi during the 1919 college football season. The season was the first under R. L. Sullivan.

Schedule

References

Ole Miss
Ole Miss Rebels football seasons
Ole Miss Rebels football